The LXI Legislature of the Congress of Mexico met from September 1, 2009, to August 31, 2012. Members of the upper house of the Congress were selected in the  elections of July 2006 while members of the lower house of the Congress were selected in the elections of July 2009.

Composition
Out of 128 Senate seats, the Institutional Revolutionary Party (known as the PRI) controlled 50; the conservative National Action Party (PAN)  controlled 33; while the left-wing Party of the Democratic Revolution (PRD) controlled 23. Additionally, the Green Party of Mexico controlled eight seats, the Labor Party and the New Alliance Party each controlled five, and the Citizens' Movement four.

Out of 500 seats of the Chamber of Deputies, the PRI had 239; the PAN had 142; and the PRD controlled 69. Among smaller parties, the Green Party controlled 23, the Labor Party controlled 13, the New Alliance controlled seven, and the Citizens' Movement controlled 6. Additionally there was one independent.

Senators

By state

Plurinominal Senators

Deputies

By relative majority election

Plurinominal Deputies

Substitute Deputies

References

Congress of Mexico by session
2012 in Mexico